Kronprinsessegade 6 is a Neoclassical property overlooking Rosenborg Castle Garden in central Copenhagen, Denmark.

History

19th century
The site was initially listed as Lot 4A when Kronprinsessegade was created in c. 1800. The present building on the site was constructed in 1803-1804 by master builder Johan Martin Quist.

The property was listed in the new cadastre of 1806 as No. 385 in St. Ann's West Quarter. It was still owned by Qvist at that time. One of the first tenants in the building was  N. Clausen (1793-1877) lived in the building from its completion in 1840–41.  C. Olufsen (1764-1827), professor of agriculture, lived in the building in 1811–12. 

The property was home to four households at the time of the 1845 census. Hans Christian Magnus Gottschalck and his wife Christiane Louise Gottschalch resided with their three children ( (aged seven to 13) with one maid. The physician Carl Peter Mathias Hansen and his wife Jacobine Sophie Birgitta Bondesen resided on the second floor  with their five children (aged one to 10(a maid, a nanny and two lodgers (students). The eldest son was the later high-ranking civil servant Christian Eskild Theodor Hansen.  Louise von Leth, a lady's companion, resided on the first floor with Ove, Peter and Hacobine Malling (aged 14 to 24) and one maid.

Peter Olsen, a shoe maker, resided in the basement.

The physician  Knud Faber (1862-1956) lived in the ground floor from 1846 until his death ten years later.

20th century
In the 1920s, Kronprinsessegade 6 housed the embassy of the Soviet Union. Knud Erichsen, a wholesale company in the sugar industry, was in 1950 based in the building.

Architecture
Quist's original building consisted of three storeys over a high cellar. The fourth storey was not added until 1896. The gate opens to a small courtyard. A three-storey side wing extends from the rear side of the building along the northside of the courtyard to a three-storey cross wing with gateway that opens to another courtyard. The building was listed on the Danish registry of protected buildings and places in 1945.

Today
Today a part of the building is used as offices for the film company Citizen Dane, that have furnished and decorated the rooms in a consistent old style..

Citizen Dane is a market leader in Denmark within corporate movies.

References

External links

Listed residential buildings in Copenhagen
Residential buildings completed in 1804
1804 establishments in Denmark